Mayckel Lahdo (born 30 December 2002) is a Swedish professional footballer who plays as a winger for Eredivisie club AZ Alkmaar.

Early life
Lahdo was born in Stockholm, Sweden, and started to play football as a youngster with local club Arameisk-Syrianska IF, before moving to Hammarby IF at age nine. After spending a few years with Djurgårdens IF, Lahdo returned to Hammarby's academy at age 12.

Club career

Hammarby IF
In 2020, Lahdo went on loan to Hammarby's affiliated club IK Frej in Division 1, Sweden's third tier. Aged 17, he played 21 games and scored five goals as the club finished 9th in the table. 

On 11 January 2021, Lahdo signed his first senior contract with Hammarby, on a two-year deal. He made his competitive debut for the club on 20 February the same year, in a 4–1 home win against AFC Eskilstuna, in the group stage of the main domestic cup, Svenska Cupen. On 30 May 2021, Lahdo won the 2020–21 Svenska Cupen with Hammarby, through a 5–4 win on penalties (0–0 after full-time) against BK Häcken in the final.

AZ
On 17 June 2022, Lahdo transferred to AZ Alkmaar in the Dutch Eredivisie, signing a contract until the summer of 2027. Having just six months left of his contract with Hammarby, the transfer fee was reportedly set at around €0.7 million.

International career
In November 2022, Lahdo was called up to the Swedish under-21's for the first time, ahead of two friendlies. He scored both in his debut against Denmark in a 2–2 draw, and in a 8–1 win against Azerbaijan.

Personal life
Lahdo was born in Sweden and is of Syriac descent.

Career statistics

Club

Honours
Hammarby IF
 Svenska Cupen: 2020–21

Notes

References

External links
 
 

2002 births
Living people
Footballers from Stockholm
Swedish people of Assyrian/Syriac descent
Swedish footballers
Assyrian footballers
Association football midfielders
Hammarby Fotboll players
IK Frej players
Hammarby Talang FF players
AZ Alkmaar players
Ettan Fotboll players
Allsvenskan players
Sweden under-21 international footballers
Swedish expatriate footballers
Swedish expatriate sportspeople in the Netherlands
Expatriate footballers in the Netherlands